Kwang-hyun, also spelled Gwang-hyun, is a Korean masculine given name. Its meaning differs based on the hanja used to write each syllable of the name. There are 13 hanja with the reading "kwang" and 35 hanja with the reading "hyun" on the South Korean government's official list of hanja which may be registered for use in given names.

People with this name include:
Dae Gwang-hyeon (fl. 10th century), Balhae prince
 (1625–1697), Joseon Dynasty veterinarian portrayed in the 2012 South Korean television series The King's Doctor
Park Kwang-hyun (footballer) (born 1967), South Korean football defender
Park Kwang-hyun (film director) (born 1969), South Korean film director 
Park Gwang-hyun (born 1977), South Korean actor 
Lee Kwang-hyun (born 1981), South Korean football defender
Na Kwang-hyun (born 1982), South Korean football midfielder
Choi Gwang-hyeon (born 1986), South Korean judoka
Nam Gwang-hyun (born 1987), South Korean football midfielder
Kim Kwang-hyun (born 1988), South Korean baseball pitcher

See also
List of Korean given names

References

Korean masculine given names